The 2008 NCAA Division I FCS football rankings are from the Sports Network media poll and the coaches poll.  This is for the 2008 season.

Legend

The Sports Network poll

The Coaches poll

Notes

References

Rankings
NCAA Division I FCS football rankings